Thorogobius ephippiatus, the leopard-spotted goby, is a species of goby native to the eastern  Atlantic Ocean and the Mediterranean Sea.

Description
This species can reach a length of  TL.

Distribution and habitat
This species can be found along the Atlantic coasts from the Skagerrak to Madeira, extending into the Mediterranean. This species inhabits vertical rock faces with crevices in which to hide. Sometimes it can be found in deep tide pools.

References

External links
 

Gobiidae
Fish described in 1839